Anaheim Street station is an at-grade light rail station on the A Line of the Los Angeles Metro Rail system. The station is located in the median of Long Beach Boulevard at its intersection with Anaheim Street, after which the station is named, in Long Beach, California.

History
When the line opened on July 14, 1990, as the Blue Line, this station was the southern terminus until the Downtown Long Beach Loop opened several months later. To facilitate the loop, which runs in a clockwise direction, the two main tracks cross each other at an "X" within the median at 9th Street south of this station. The southbound track then continues in the median by itself beyond 8th Street, passes two stations, then curves west onto the 1st Street Transit Mall, where it has a brief 2-track segment through the Downtown Long Beach station (which is designated as the terminal point of the line). From there, the tracks continue as northbound, first turning north into the median of Pacific Avenue (where they rejoin as a single track). After passing one more station, the track then curves east onto 8th Street before turning back north onto Long Beach Boulevard.

Service

Station layout

Hours and frequency

Connections 
, the following connections are available:
Los Angeles Metro Bus:  ,

Notable places nearby 
St. Mary Medical Center

References

A Line (Los Angeles Metro) stations
Transportation in Long Beach, California
Railway stations in the United States opened in 1990
1990 establishments in California